Ronchères may refer to the following places in France:

 Ronchères, Aisne, a commune in the department of Aisne
 Ronchères, Yonne, a commune in the department of Yonne
 Sons-et-Ronchères, a commune in the department of Aisne